The Hong Kong Gold Cup is a Group One Hong Kong Thoroughbred horse race held annually since 1979 at Sha Tin Racecourse. It is open to horses three years of age and older. Run on turf, it was initially run over a distance of 1,800 metres, but is now set at 2,000 metres (ten furlongs) and it offers a purse of HK$12,000,000. 

The second leg of the Hong Kong Triple Crown the Group One race comes after the Steward's Cup and is followed by the Hong Kong Champions & Chater Cup. A HK$5,000,000 bonus is paid to the owner of the horse winning all three legs of the Triple Crown Series and a consolation bonus of HK$2,000,000 will be paid to the owner of the horse winning any two legs.

Hong Kong Champion and former Horse of the Year River Verdon won this race three times and in 1994 became the only horse to ever win the Triple Crown.

Recent winners of the Hong Kong Gold Cup 

 The 2002 winner Industrial Pioneer was later exported to Europe and renamed Sobriety.

See also
 List of Hong Kong horse races

References
Racing Post:

 The Hong Kong Jockey Club official website of Citibank Hong Kong Gold Cup(2011/12)
 Racing Information of Citibank Hong Kong Gold Cup (2011/12)
 The Hong Kong Jockey Club 

Recurring sporting events established in 1979
Horse races in Hong Kong
Open middle distance horse races
Triple Crown of Thoroughbred Racing
1979 establishments in Hong Kong